Marián Zimen (born 3 August 1980) is a former Slovak football defender, who was the best known as a player of MFK Dubnica and currently manager of AS Trenčín.

External links
at astrencin.sk
at football-lineups.com

References

1980 births
Living people
Sportspeople from Trenčín
Slovak footballers
Association football defenders
FK Dubnica players
Slovak Super Liga players
AS Trenčín managers
Slovak Super Liga managers
Wisła Kraków non-playing staff
Expatriate football managers in Poland
Slovak expatriate sportspeople in Poland